Babinec may refer to:

 Babinec, Slovakia
 Babinec, Croatia

See also 

 Babiniec (disambiguation)